Mathieu Traversy is a Canadian politician in the province of Quebec. Since 2021, he has been the mayor of Terrebonne. Previously, he represented the riding of Terrebonne in the National Assembly of Quebec from the 2008 provincial election until his defeat in the 2018 provincial election. He was a member of the Parti Québécois.

Traversy attended the Cégep régional de Lanaudière in Terrebonne and later the Université du Québec à Montréal in political science. He previously worked in the department of recreation for the city of Terrebonne.
 
Traversy defeated Jean-François Therrien of the ADQ in the 2008 elections.

Electoral Record

* Result compared to Action démocratique

References

External links
 
 Parti Quebecois biopage 

1984 births
French Quebecers
Living people
Mayors of Terrebonne, Quebec
Parti Québécois MNAs
People from Mascouche
21st-century Canadian politicians